Inés Katzenstein is an Argentine curator, art historian, and art critic who specializes in Latin American art.

Early life and education 
Katzenstein was born in Argentina.

Katzenstein has a B.A. in communications from the University of Buenos Aires. In 2001, Katzenstein received an M.A. in curatorial studies from the Center for Curatorial Studies at Bard College.

Career 
In 2000, Katzenstein got a position at the Museum of Modern Art, where she began as an assistant to the editor-in-chief of Listen, Here, Now! Argentine Art in the 1960s, part of MoMa's International Program Primary Documents publication series, and the first one to focus on Latin American art. She later became an editor of the publication.

From 2004 to 2008, Katzenstein worked as a curator at the Malba-Fundación Costantini, where her focus was on contemporary Argentine art.

In 2007, Katzenstein was the curator of the Argentine Pavilion exhibition at the Venice Biennale, which featured paintings by the artist Guillermo Kuitca.

In 2008, Katzenstein founded the Department of Art at the Universidad Torcuato Di Tella (UTDT).

In 2018, Katzenstein became the director of the newly formed Patricia Phelps de Cisneros Research Institute for the Study of Art from Latin America as well as the Curator of Latin American Art at the Museum of Modern Art.

Selected exhibitions 
 2003: Liliana Porter: Photography and Fiction, Centro Cultural Recoleta (Buenos Aires)
 2005: David Lamelas, Alien, Foreigner, Ètranger, Aüslander, Museo Rufino (Tamayo, Mexico)
 2007: Guillermo Kuitca, si yo fuera el invierno mismo, 52nd Venice Biennale (Venice, Italy) – curator of the Argentina Pavilion
 2007: Zona Franca, projects by Leopoldo Estol and M7red, Mercosur Biennial – co-curator
 2010: Di Tella, an Episode in the History of TV, Espacio Fundación Telefónica (Buenos Aires) – co-curator
 2013: Aquella mañana fue como si recuperara si no la felicidad, sí la energía, una energía que se parecía mucho al humor, un humor que se parecía mucho a la memoria, Parque de la Memoria (Buenos Aires)
 2018: Sur Moderno: Journeys of Abstraction—The Patricia Phelps de Cisneros Gift, Museum of Modern Art (New York) – co-curator

Selected works and publications 
 
 
  – 18 de noviembre de 2003 al 29 de febrero de 2004, Centro Cultural Recoleta, Junín 1930, Buenos Aires
 
  – Published in conjunction with the exhibition organized by and held at the Los Angeles County Museum of Art, Los Angeles, June 13-Oct. 3 2004 ; Miami Art Museum, Florida, Nov. 18, 2004-May 1, 2005
  – Catalog of an exhibition held at Museo de Arte Latinoamericano, Buenos Aires, Sept. 23-Nov. 21, 2005
 
  – Representacion Argentina, 52. Esposizione internazionale d'arte, La biennale di Venezia. Catalogue of an exhibition held during the 52nd BIennale di Venezia from 6 Jun. to 23 Sept. 2007
  –  Accompanies a retrospective exhibition organized by the 9th Buenos Aires Festival Internacional de Cine Independiente, April 13-June 11, 2007
  – Auditorio arteBA'08, 29 de mayo al 1o. de junio de 2008
 
 
 
  – Catalogue of an exhibition held at Espacio Fundación Telefónica (Buenos Aires), 22 Oct. - 18 Dec. 2010
  – Catalog of an exhibition held at the Sam Fox School of Design & Visual Arts at Washington University in St. Louis, September 9, 2011 – January 9, 2012

References

External links 
 Inés Katzenstein at Issuu
 

Living people
Argentine art historians
Argentine women historians
Argentine art critics
Women art critics
Argentine curators
People from Buenos Aires
Year of birth missing (living people)
Argentine women curators